
Whaplode Drove is a village in the civil parish of Whaplode , in the South Holland district of Lincolnshire, England.

Whaplode Drove is a largely rural village and lies in the middle of the Lincolnshire Fens.

The name 'Whaplode' derives from the Old English cwappa-lad meaning 'eel pout watercourse'.

Community
Village amenities include a post office with shop, a church, garage and a social club.

The ecclesiastical parish is Whaplode Drove. The parish church, on Broadgate, is dedicated to St John the Baptist. The parish is part of the Whaplode Drove Group of the Deanery of Elloe East. The only other parish in the group is Gedney Hill.

The church maintains a church hall, and the village also has a war memorial, and The Elizabethan centre, a community hall intended to commemorate the coronation of Queen Elizabeth II, but which took until 1982 to be built.

References

External links

Villages in Lincolnshire
South Holland, Lincolnshire